Bee Gees Greatest is a greatest hits album by British pop group Bee Gees. Released by RSO Records in October 1979, the album is a retrospective of the group's material from 1975 to 1979. A remastered and expanded version of the album was released by Reprise Records in 2007.

Content

The original release was a double album, with album sleeves and labels featuring pictures of each brother on the label and all three brothers on side four, while each record sleeve was adorned with the Bee Gees Greatest logo. 

Side one contains disco tracks featuring "Jive Talkin'", "Night Fever", "Tragedy", "You Should Be Dancing" and "Stayin' Alive". 

Side two contains ballads and featured "How Deep Is Your Love", "Too Much Heaven", "Love So Right", "(Our Love) Don't Throw It All Away" and "Fanny (Be Tender with My Love)". 

Side three consists of B-sides and album tracks such as "If I Can't Have You", "You Stepped Into My Life", "Love Me", "More Than a Woman" and "Rest Your Love on Me". Side three also consists of songs that spawned cover versions for other artists. Side four contains "Nights on Broadway", "Spirits (Having Flown)", "Wind of Change", "Love You Inside Out" and "Children of the World".

Two Top 40 charting singles, "Boogie Child" (#12) and "Edge of the Universe (Live)" (#26) were omitted in favor of tracks that other artists had hits with such as "Love Me" and "If I Can't Have You" (Yvonne Elliman) and "You Stepped Into My Life" (Melba Moore and Wayne Newton). 

Incidentally "Boogie Child" reached slightly higher on the Billboard Hot 100 than Yvonne Elliman's version of "Love Me" (#14), while Melba Moore's and Wayne Newton's recordings of "You Stepped Into My Life" only peaked at 47 and 90, respectively, in 1979. 

"Boogie Child" did appear in the box set Tales from the Brothers Gibb, but it was again passed over on the double disc set Their Greatest Hits: The Record from 2001.

Reissues

Greatest was released on CD as a two disc set, but has since has been deleted domestically with the release of The Record.

On 18 September 2007, Reprise Records released a remastered and expanded version of Greatest. Many of the tracks on Greatest have been previously remastered, but the album contains the first release of remastered versions of "You Stepped Into My Life", "Rest Your Love on Me", "Wind of Change", "Spirits (Having Flown)", and "Children of the World". 

In addition, there are extended versions of "Stayin' Alive" and an unreleased Bee Gees track, "Warm Ride", which was written for the group Rare Earth. The song ended up being recorded by brother Andy Gibb for his album, After Dark. The re-release contains new mixes of "You Should Be Dancing", "If I Can't Have You", "Night Fever" and "More Than a Woman" and as a hidden track, a new mix of "Stayin' Alive". 

Billboard's unofficial policy states an album requires at least 33% new material to qualify as a new release; Bee Gees Greatest contains about 28% new material, thus making it a re-issue.

Bee Gees Greatest topped the Billboard album charts early in 1980, becoming their third consecutive number one album. The re-issue of Bee Gees Greatest debuted at No. 1 on Billboard's Pop Catalog charts for the week of 30 September 2007. There was some question as to whether Billboard was going to treat this as a new release or a re-issue. The set scanned over 20,000 copies for the week, making it the 35th best selling album in the country, good enough to place in Billboard's Top 40.

Track listing
All tracks were written by Barry, Robin and Maurice Gibb, except where noted.

2007 re-issue edition

Charts

Certifications

References

1979 greatest hits albums
Bee Gees compilation albums
RSO Records compilation albums